Mount Ulandra is a mountain with an elevation of   that is located within the Ulandra Nature Reserve in the South West Slopes region of New South Wales, Australia.

Atop the mountain are telecommunications towers, including television broadcast towers for all television networks covering much of the Riverina region. The reserve is located on the western hills of the Southern Tablelands. The reserve was dedicated in 1981 to protect stands of Cootamundra wattle.

References

Ulandra
Riverina